Pityocona porphyroscia is a moth in the family Gelechiidae. It was described by Edward Meyrick in 1927. It is found on Samoa.

References

Pityocona
Moths described in 1927